Days in the Country is a 2004 Franco-Chilean film written and directed by Raúl Ruiz. It won the International Critics Award at the Lima Latin American Film Festival in 2006.

Plot
Two elderly men converse in a bar in Santiago de Chile, speaking as if they are deceased, blurring the line between reality and imagination.

Cast
 Marcial Edwards
 Mario Montilles
 Bélgica Castro
 Ignacio Agüero
 Francisco Reyes
 Amparo Noguera

References

External links
 
 Description at Rouge online film magazine by Maxime Renaudin

2004 films
2000s French-language films
Films directed by Raúl Ruiz
French drama films
Chilean drama films
2000s French films